Chaney Rush Creek is a stream in the U.S. state of South Dakota.

Chaney Rush is derived from a French phrase meaning "chain of rock".

See also
List of rivers of South Dakota

References

Rivers of Hyde County, South Dakota
Rivers of Hughes County, South Dakota
Rivers of South Dakota